Tanner Varner (born July 13, 1984) is an American football linebacker who is currently retired. He first enrolled at Ellsworth Community College before transferring to the University of Northern Iowa. Varner has been a member of the Arkansas Twisters, Grand Rapids Rampage, Iowa Barnstormers, Philadelphia Soul, Omaha Nighthawks, Kansas City Command, San Jose SaberCats, Orlando Predators, Las Vegas Outlaws and Qingdao Clipper.

Early years
Varner played high school football at Iowa Class 4A Ottumwa High School in Ottumwa, Iowa and graduated in 2002. He earned three Varsity letters in baseball and track & field and two letters each in football and basketball. He was named Second Team All-State in baseball and track & field and First Team All-State in football. He had numerous accomplishments during his senior year in football including being named to the Des Moines Register Elite All-State football team, Des Moines Register Iowa Class 4-A First Team, First Team All-CIML Metro Conference, First Team Iowa Newspaper Association Class 4-A, All-State First Team Defense. Was second in the state in punt returns with a 20.8 average. Earned the Ottumwa "A" Club "Outstanding Athlete" award. Was team captain and MVP as well as named Most Valuable Defensive Back. Caught 23 passes for 471 yards and three TDs, tallied 97 tackles and six interceptions, recorded 25 punt returns for 521 yards and three TDs and three kickoff returns for 74 yards.

College career
Varner first played college football for the Ellsworth Community College Panthers from 2002 to 2003.  At Ellsworth CC: 2002 Region XI All-Academic second team. Honorable mention All-Region team. 2003 team was Graphic Edge Bowl Champions. Led squad with 84 total tackles, including 47 solos along with five tackles for loss. Had seven pass deflections and led squad with three interceptions for 85 yards, including one for a TD, 16 pass breakups. Preseason All-American. Named conference's Outstanding Defensive Back and team's Most Valuable Defensive Player. 2003 Graphic Edge Bowl Championship IKON Defensive Player of the Game.  Awarded Ellsworth's Rod Mather Award, given to the player exhibiting the top leadership and football qualities.

Varner transferred to play for the Northern Iowa Panthers of the University of Northern Iowa from 2004 to 2007. He recorded 85.5 tackles and three interceptions his senior year, earning First Team All-American and All Gateway Conference honors while being named the Panthers' Most Valuable Defensive Player. He was also named the Defensive MVP of the 2005 Division I-AA NCAA Football Championship Game between the Northern Iowa Panthers and the Appalachian State Mountaineers. The game was played on December 16, 2005, at Finley Stadium, home field of the University of Tennessee at Chattanooga

Professional career

Arkansas Twisters
Varner played for the Arkansas Twisters of the AF2 in 2007. He finished third on the team with 83.5 tackles, recorded nine interceptions, returning one for a touchdown and earning second team All-Conference honors.

Grand Rapids Rampage
Varner signed with the Grand Rapids Rampage on October 30, 2007. He was released by the Rampage on February 23, 2008.

Iowa Barnstormers
Varner played for the Iowa Barnstormers from 2008 to 2010. The Barnstormers were members of the Af2 from 2008 to 2009, before returning to the Arena Football League in 2010. He posted 91 tackles, seven interceptions and two forced fumbles in 2008. He recorded 119.5 tackles, 19 pass breakups, eight interceptions and two forced fumbles in 2009, earning Second Team All-American Conference honors. Varner set an Iowa Barnstormer single-season franchise record with 129.5 tackles as a First-Team All-Arena rookie in 2010. He also ranked fourth in the league with eight interceptions in 2010, returning two for touchdowns.

Philadelphia Soul
Varner was signed by the Philadelphia Soul on December 21, 2010. He recorded 45 total tackles, intercepted five passes, forced a fumble and returned two interceptions for touchdowns in seven games with the Soul in 2011.

Omaha Nighthawks
Varner spent the 2011 UFL season with the Omaha Nighthawks of the United Football League.

Kansas City Command
Varner was traded to the Kansas City Command on March 14, 2012.

San Jose Sabercats
Varner was traded to the San Jose Sabercats on March 20, 2012. He recorded 63 tackles, two sacks, two forced fumbles, two fumble recoveries and three interceptions in 12 games for Sabercats in 2012.

Orlando Predators
Varner signed with the Orlando Predators on July 10, 2013. He earned First Team All-Arena honors after recording 68 tackles and five interceptions in 18 games with the Predators in 2014.

Las Vegas Outlaws
Varner was selected by the Las Vegas Outlaws with the first pick of the 2014 Expansion Draft. He became a free agent after the 2015 season.

Qingdao Clipper
Varner was selected by the Qingdao Clipper in the tenth round of the 2016 CAFL Draft. He was named to the CAFL Dream Team in 2016.

References

External links
Just Sports Stats

Living people
1984 births
Players of American football from Iowa
American football defensive backs
American football linebackers
Ellsworth Panthers football players
Northern Iowa Panthers football players
Arkansas Twisters players
Iowa Barnstormers players
Philadelphia Soul players
Omaha Nighthawks players
San Jose SaberCats players
Orlando Predators players
Las Vegas Outlaws (arena football) players
People from Ottumwa, Iowa
Qingdao Clipper players